It's Elementary: Talking About Gay Issues in School is a 1996 documentary film.

It's Elementary may also refer to:

 "It's Elementary", a 2007 work by Robert Winston, Baron Winston
 "It's Elementary My Dear Pup Club", a 2013 episode of Pound Puppies